The Boston Society of Film Critics Award for Best Foreign Language Film is one of the annual film awards given by the Boston Society of Film Critics.

Winners

1990s
{| class="wikitable" width="95%" cellpadding="5"
|-
!width="050"|Year
!width="250"|English title
!width="250"|Original title
!width="150"|Country
!width="200"|Director
|-
|style="text-align:center;"|1990|| Mr. Hire||Monsieur Hire||France||Patrice Leconte
|-
|style="text-align:center;"|1991|| Europa Europa|| Europa Europa || Germany/France/Poland||Agnieszka Holland
|-
|style="text-align:center;"|1992|| Raise the Red Lantern|| 大紅燈籠高高掛Dà Hóng Dēnglong Gāogāo Guà || China||Zhang Yimou
|-
|style="text-align:center;"|1993|| Farewell My Concubine || 霸王別姬Ba wang bie ji || China/Hong Kong||Chen Kaige
|-
|style="text-align:center;"|1994||  Three Colours: Red ||Trois couleurs: Rouge||France/Poland|| Krzysztof Kieślowski
|-
|style="text-align:center;"|1995|| Mina Tannenbaum || || France ||Martine Dugowson
|-
|style="text-align:center;"|1996|| My Favorite Season ||Ma saison préférée||France||André Téchiné
|-
|style="text-align:center;"|1997||  Underground|| Serbo-Croatian: PodzemljeSerbian Cyrillic: Подземље ||Yugoslavia/France/Germany||Emir Kusturica
|-
|style="text-align:center;"|1998|| A Taste of Cherry||طعم گيلاس Ta'm-e gīlās||France/Iran|| Abbas Kiarostami
|-
|style="text-align:center;"|1999|| All About My Mother ||Todo sobre mi madre||Spain||Pedro Almodóvar
|}

2000s

2010s

2020sLa Llorona'' - Guatemala - Jayro Bustamante

See also
Academy Award for Best International Feature Film

References

Boston Society of Film Critics Awards
Film awards for Best Foreign Language Film
Awards established in 1990